The palmerworm (Dichomeris ligulella) is a moth of the family Gelechiidae. It is found in eastern North America.

The wingspan is 15–18 mm. Adults are on wing from April to October. There is one generation per year.

The larvae feed on apple, hackberry, hazel and oak. The larvae skeletonize leaves and fold or roll them during feeding. It is occasionally responsible for widespread defoliation of hardwood species. Outbreaks rarely last more than one or two years and usually occur during unusually hot and dry springs.

References

External links
Images
Bug Guide
Larval Stage info
Moths of North Dakota

ligulella
Moths described in 1818